Nixxes Software B.V. is a Dutch video game developer based at the World Trade Center in Utrecht. It was founded by former demoscene developer Jurjen Katsman in 1999 to port the game Legacy of Kain: Soul Reaver to the Dreamcast. In July 2021, the company was acquired by Sony Interactive Entertainment to help bring its games from PlayStation platforms to personal computers. As of 2020, 40% of Nixxes' work comprises game ports, with the remainder being co-development efforts like the production of art assets.

History 
During the mid-1990s, Jurjen Katsman was a computer science student, gamer, and demoscene developer in the Netherlands. During one weekend, he was invited to meet Dutch developers working for the British publisher Eidos Interactive. Without his knowledge, these developers had arranged a job interview for him. He was hired by Eidos and asked to relocate to London within three weeks, forcing him to cease his studies. Katsman remained in London for two years before being transferred to Crystal Dynamics in the United States, which Eidos had acquired in 1998. After some time of living in hotels, Katsman chose to return to the Netherlands. By this time, Crystal Dynamics was developing Legacy of Kain: Soul Reaver and sought a developer capable of porting it to the Dreamcast. Believing that Katsman had the right skill set, the company hired him for the conversion. At their behest, Katsman founded Nixxes Software in 1999, deriving the name from "nix", his demoscene nickname. The Dreamcast port of Legacy of Kain: Soul Reaver was Nixxes' first project, which Katsman completed on his own.

By 2013, when Nixxes was working on Thief, the company employed seventeen people.

The company faced some hardships during the onset of the COVID-19 pandemic because a lot of hardware had to remain in the office while most employees transitioned to remote work, and many workflows required a high-speed connection to the company servers. On 1 July 2021, Sony Interactive Entertainment announced its acquisition of Nixxes Software to undisclosed terms. In a statement to Famitsu later that month, Sony Interactive Entertainment's CEO, Jim Ryan, stated that the acquisition aimed at bringing first-party PlayStation games to personal computers. After initially assisting Guerilla Games in patching the Microsoft Windows version of Horizon Zero Dawn Complete Edition throughout 2020 and 2021, their first standalone project as a PlayStation Studios subsidary was revealed in June 2022 to be the PC ports of Marvel's Spider-Man Remastered and Marvel's Spider-Man: Miles Morales, developed in collaboration with sister studio Insomniac Games.

List of games

References

External links 

 

Companies based in Utrecht (province)
Organisations based in Utrecht (city)
Video game companies established in 1999
Dutch companies established in 1999
Video game companies of the Netherlands
Video game development companies
PlayStation Studios
2021 mergers and acquisitions